Werner Horn (born 12 May 1970) is a South African lawyer and politician. He has served as a Member of the National Assembly since May 2014. He was a councillor of the Mangaung Metropolitan Municipality between 2006 and 2014. Horn is a member of the Democratic Alliance.

Career

Local politics
Horn is a member of the Democratic Alliance. He was elected as a councillor of the Mangaung Metropolitan Municipality in March 2006. He was re-elected to a second term in May 2011.

Parliamentary career
Horn was elected to the National Assembly in the 7 May 2014 general election. He became an MP on 21 May 2014. He represents the Free State Province. On 5 June 2014, he was named Shadow Deputy Minister of the Justice and Correctional Services portfolios by the DA parliamentary leader, Mmusi Maimane. Horn served as the deputy for both Glynnis Breytenbach (Shadow Minister of Justice) and James Selfe (Shadow Minister of Correctional Services).

During his first term as an MP, he served as an Alternate Member of the  Portfolio Committee on Justice and Constitutional Development. He was an Alternate Member of the Ad Hoc Committee to nominate a person for appointment of Public Protector between May 2016 and August 2016.

Horn was re-elected for a second term as an MP in May 2019. On 5 June 2019, Maimane appointed his new shadow cabinet, in which the Justice and Correctional Services portfolios were merged into one portfolio with Horn as the Shadow Deputy Minister and Glynnis Breytenbach as the Shadow Minister. He still serves on the Portfolio Committee on Justice and Correctional Services. On 27 February 2020, he became an Alternate Member of the  Ad Hoc Committee to Amend Section 25 of the Constitution.

Newly elected DA leader John Steenhuisen announced his shadow cabinet on 5 December 2020 wherein he split the Justice and Correctional Services portfolio and appointed Horn as the new Shadow Deputy Minister of Justice.

Provincial politics
On 14 November 2020, Horn was elected to succeed Annelie Lotriet as the provincial chairperson of the DA in the Free State.

References

Living people
Afrikaner people
People from Bloemfontein
Democratic Alliance (South Africa) politicians
21st-century South African politicians
Members of the National Assembly of South Africa
1970 births